"Kainei" Edward Espé Brown (born March 24, 1945) is an American Zen teacher and writer.  He is the author of The Tassajara Bread Book, written at the Tassajara Zen Mountain Center, as well as other cookbooks that are still influential.

Early life

Brown's mother died when he was three years old. Three days after her death, his father decided to send Brown and his older brother Dwite to an orphanage in San Anselmo, California, because that was the only way he could visit them regularly (the alternative was to send the boys to live with relatives in South Dakota). Brown's father remarried four years later, and then the boys returned home.

In 1955, Dwite and Brown flew to Falls Church, Virginia to visit their aunt Alice. It was her homemade bread baking that inspired Brown, who called her bread "fabulously delicious". He wondered why other people weren't eating the same thing instead of "foamy white bread" bought in a store. Brown resolved to learn how to bake bread and to teach others how.

When he got home he asked his mother to teach him to bake bread. She said, "No, yeast makes me nervous." Brown eventually learned to bake bread, eleven years later, from two chefs at Tassajara. Brown later asked his brother if he remembered their trip to visit Alice. Dwite said yes he did, "What I remember was the Smithfield ham, but it didn't change my life".

San Francisco

He wrote The Tassajara Bread Book in 1970 with a 100 advance from the publisher. As of 2003, 750,000 copies were in print, with 3,000 copies still selling every year. From the mid-1960s to the mid-'80s, Brown lived, cooked, taught or was a manager at the Tassajara Zen Mountain Center, Green Gulch Farm Zen Center and the San Francisco Zen Center.

A Dharma heir of Sojun Mel Weitsman, in 1971, Brown was ordained as a Zen priest by Shunryu Suzuki,  who gave him the Dharma name Jusan Kainei ("Longevity Mountain, Peaceful Sea"). He edited Suzuki's book Not Always So in 2002 after Suzuki's death in 1971.

Brown helped to found Greens Restaurant in San Francisco. He and founding chef Deborah Madison wrote The Greens Cookbook in 1987.

Later years
Brown leads the Peaceful Sea Sangha in Fairfax, Marin County, California and is a member of the Soto Zen Buddhist Association. Brown makes his living by teaching meditation in his home and by giving baking and cooking workshops at Zen centers in the United States, Canada and Austria. Brown tells his students that "every dough is different, just as every day is different". He also says that baking and living both come down to the same thing: "developing attention and awareness".

He combines zazen with qigong, yoga, and handwriting change, so that some critics call his teaching style "Zen Lite". Brown told Carol Ness, writing for the San Francisco Chronicle, "I'm not insistent on the forms. We're not all serious and sober. We sit and we talk."

Brown is the subject of the 2007 documentary film How to Cook Your Life by Doris Dörrie, in which he and Dörrie suggest embracing joy and spirit within food habits. "When you’re cooking, you’re not just cooking, you’re not just working on food...you’re also working on yourself, you’re working on other people." He also appears in Spiritual Revolution (2008), a less well-known film by Alan Swyer.

Books
 The Tassajara Bread Book.(2011) [1970]  Shambhala Publications.  Written at the Tassajara Zen Mountain Center.
 1970 first edition: , .
 1995 25th anniversary edition: , .
 Tassajara Cooking. (1986)  Shambhala Publications.  , .
 Tomato Blessings and Radish Teachings: Recipes and Reflections. (1997)  Riverhead Books.  , .
 The Tassajara Recipe Book. (2000)  Shambhala Publications.  , .
 The Greens Cookbook, with Deborah Madison. (2001) Random House Broadway imprint.  , .
 Not Always So: Practicing the True Spirit of Zen.  Lectures by Shunryu Suzuki (2008) [2003] (ed.)  HarperCollins. , .
 The Complete Tassajara Cookbook: Recipes, Techniques, and Reflections from the Famed Zen Kitchen  Shambhala Publications. (2011). 
 No Recipe: Cooking as Spiritual Practice Sounds True (2018).

See also
Timeline of Zen Buddhism in the United States

References

External links
 Edward Espe Brown website, Peaceful Sea Sangha.

1945 births
Living people
American religious writers
People from San Anselmo, California
San Francisco Zen Center
Soto Zen Buddhists
Zen Buddhism writers
Zen Buddhist spiritual teachers
American Zen Buddhists
Writers from the San Francisco Bay Area
Food and drink in the San Francisco Bay Area
Religious leaders from the San Francisco Bay Area